Carlos Fernando Valenzuela (born 22 April 1997) is an Argentine professional footballer who plays as a winger or forward for Tijuana.

Club career
Valenzuela was moved into the Racing Club first-team squad in April 2016; manager Facundo Sava selected him as a substitute for a victory away to Huracán but didn't use him. In July 2016, Valenzuela joined Nueva Chicago of Primera B Nacional on loan. He made his senior debut on 10 September against Douglas Haig, before scoring his first goal five appearances later in a 5–1 win over Juventud Unida. He returned to Racing Club in June 2017 following one goal in thirteen for Nueva Chicago. Primera B Metropolitana's Barracas Central signed Valenzuela on 30 June 2018. He scored three in his first four.

After twenty-four goals, including four in Primera B Nacional following promotion in 2018–19, in two seasons for Barracas Central, Valenzuela departed in August 2020 to join Portuguese Primeira Liga side Famalicão on loan. His first appearance came in a 5–1 home defeat to Benfica on 18 September, with his opening goal arriving ten days later against Belenenses SAD.

International career
Valenzuela was called up to the Argentina U23s for the 2019 Pan American Games in Peru. He scored three times in the competition, netting in victories over Ecuador, Panama and Uruguay. Valenzuela netted as Argentina defeated Honduras in the final on 10 August, earning the forward a gold medal.

Career statistics
.

Honours
Barracas Central
 Primera B Metropolitana: 2018–19

Argentina U23
 Pan American Games: 2019

References

External links

1997 births
Living people
People from Santiago del Estero
Argentine footballers
Argentine expatriate footballers
Argentina youth international footballers
Association football forwards
Footballers at the 2019 Pan American Games
Pan American Games gold medalists for Argentina
Pan American Games medalists in football
Medalists at the 2019 Pan American Games
Olympic footballers of Argentina
Footballers at the 2020 Summer Olympics
Racing Club de Avellaneda footballers
Nueva Chicago footballers
Barracas Central players
F.C. Famalicão players
Argentine Primera División players
Primera Nacional players
Primera B Metropolitana players
Primeira Liga players
Expatriate footballers in Portugal
Argentine expatriate sportspeople in Portugal
Sportspeople from Santiago del Estero Province